Frăția or Fratia may refer to:

 Frăția (union), a Romanian union that merged into the National Confederation of Free Trade Unions of Romania – Brotherhood
 Frăția (secret society), active in Romania in the 1840s
 Fratia (crustacean), a genus of crustaceans in the family Fratiidae

See also 
 Înfrățirea (disambiguation)